is a railway station in Fukuchi, Fukuoka Prefecture, Japan. It is on the Ita Line, operated by the Heisei Chikuhō Railway. Trains arrive roughly every 30 minutes.

Platforms

External links
Fureai-Shōriki Station (Heisei Chikuhō Railway website)

References

Railway stations in Fukuoka Prefecture
Railway stations in Japan opened in 1997
Heisei Chikuhō Railway Ita Line